Renton Thistle Football Club was an association football club based in the town of Renton, in Dunbartonshire.

History

The club was founded in 1873, in the wake of other clubs in the West Dunbartonshire area such as Vale of Leven F.C., Renton F.C., and Dumbarton F.C..  

The club entered the Scottish Cup for the first time in 1875–76, and gained a walkover in the first round after opponents Queen's Park Juniors scratched.  In the second round the Thistle lost 2–1 at Dumbarton.

With other clubs in the region having greater backing, the club remained firmly in their shadows, and only ever won one Scottish Cup tie; against Alclutha F.C. in the first round in 1877–78.  A bye took the club into the third round for the only time in its history, where it lost to Renton 2–0. 

The club also progressed to the second round on two other occasions, under the rule that both clubs proceeded after two draws, against Vale of Leven Rovers of Alexandria in 1876–77 and against Alexandria F.C. in 1878–79.  In the former year the club lost 5–1 at the Lennox club of Dumbarton in the second round; in the latter, the club was hammered 11–0 at Vale of Leven.

The Vale of Leven defeat was the last Cup tie for the club.  It entered the 1879–80 tournament but scratched to Lennox in the first round.  The final game recorded for the club was at the end of the 1880–81 season, against Holytown Junior of Hamilton.  The name was revived by another club in 1885.

Colours

The club's colours were blue shirts, white knickers, and red hose.

Ground

The club does not seem to have had a permanent enclosed ground, listing its home as "the south end of Renton village".

References

Renton Thistle
Association football clubs established in 1873
Association football clubs disestablished in 1881
Football in West Dunbartonshire